Vincenzo Eusebi (born 29 January 1960) is an Italian engineer, architect and designer.
Eusebi studied engineering and architecture at the Marche Polytechnic University in Ancona.

Eusebi is the founding partner of NOTHING STUDIO, atelier of architecture, planning, interior design, design and graphics.

Life and career
To the activity as a designer Enzo Eusebi associated over the years an intense work of study and critical reflection on the themes of social and sustainable architecture; he has held lectures and conferences with numerous organizations and institutions. His architecture is characterized by a formal research, which tends to make every project a meaningful presence in the urban space, and a rigorous technique that provides the best functionality of the structures, systems and organization of spaces.

His dual training as engineer and architect has allowed to this young designer, to always remain up to the most advanced aesthetic solutions proposed by contemporary culture, in a balance that is renewed in all his works, and that is Highlighted by the numerous realizations in Italy and abroad. In all his projects we can see a constant commitment to environmental protection through the use and re-use of materials, through research and analysis aimed at minimizing the environmental impact.

The awards received for the merits of his activities have consolidated his international image and he is considered one of the most interesting designers in the area of architecture. Recently he has participated at Saint Petersburg Design Week 2014, to the Tianjin Design Week 2015, and was selected as art director and designer of the Pavilion of the World Association of Agronomists (WAA) for Expo 2015 (Prize Contest Toward a Sustainable Expo).

Personal life
Eusebi is married to Adriana, a dentist who is the mother of his two daughters, Aliai and Mie.

Selected projects

2002 – Siemens General Hospital, Giulianova (Italy)
2003 – IPSSAR High School, San Benedetto del Tronto (Italy)
2005 – Kunlun Towers, Beijing (China)
2005 – Chalet Touch, Porto Sant'Elpidio (Italy)
2005 – Oncology Center, Sant'Omero (Italy)
2005 – Economics Faculty renovation, San Benedetto del Tronto (Italy)
2006 – Berloni Concept Kitchen not for food
2006 – Ashoka Design Center, Monteprandone (Italy)
2008 – Berloni Quore Kitchen
2008 – Teuco Solid Surface Bathtub
2008 – Residential Complex Feng Chi Island, (China)
2008 – Club House, Hui Dong (China)
2008 – Complex, Sochi (Russia)
2009 – Berloni Duemila60 Kitchen
2009 – Urban-renewal plan "Craft Village", Ta' Qali (Malta)
2010 – Church of the Resurrection Chiesa della Resurrezione (309), L'Aquila (Italy)
2010 – Sal.Pi. UNO srl Factory, Preci (Italy)
2010 – Garofoli spa Headquarter enlargement, Castelfidardo (Italy)
2010 – Opera House enlargement, Milan (Italy)
2011 – Palazzo della Civiltà Italiana (EUR) restructuring and upgrading, Roma (Italy)
2011 – Unicità d'Italia at Palazzo delle Esposizioni, Rome (Italy)
2011 – Unicità d'Italia at Museum of Contemporary Art of Rome (MACRO – La Pelanda), Rome (Italy)
2012 – Albero produced by iGuzzini illuminazione
2012 – Courthouse, L'Aquila (Italy)
2012 – Terme del Vino project, Offida (Italy)
2014 – UnipolSai Tower, Milan (Italy)
2015 – World Association of Agronomist (WAA) and CONAF Expo 2015 pavilions at Expo 2015, Milan (Italy)
2016 – Quid produced by iGuzzini illuminazione

Conferences
1993 – "Procedure automatizzate di prevenzione e controllo antinfortunistico nella progettazione di organismi civili" Atti di convegno, SAIE 1993, 20–24 October 1993, Bologna (Italy)
1993 – "Il comportamento dei laterizi sottoposti a trattamenti idrofobizzanti", Atti di convegno, 29–30 October 1993, Naples (Italy)
1994 – "Old and new bricks, old and new masonries: results of an experimentation of different waterproofing agents", International Congress on Restoration of Architectural Heritage and Building
1994 – "Verso il sistema informativo per la pianificazione degli adempimenti antinfortunistici nei cantieri edili", 12 May 1994, Marche Polytechnic University Faculty of Engineering, Ancona (Italy)
1994 – "Slow Diffusion" and "Under Pressure", 10th International Brick/Block Masonry Conference
2002 – "Emozioni nei campi di concentramento", 28 January 2002, (Italy)
2006 - "Not For Food, NOTHING STUDIO for Berloni", Italian Design on Tour
2007 – "Not For Food", Athens (Greece)
2007 – "La variabile temporale nella rappresentazione del progetto, l'esperienza Not For Food"
2007 – "Arte all'arte: dalle installazioni alle città d'arte. Idee e progetti per la sostenibilità della città del futuro", 25–28 October 2007, Florence (Italy)
2007 – "Chinese Construction of the City", 2 November 2007
2007 – "La Forza della Squadra, il coraggio di innovare insieme", 30 November 2007, Udine (Italy)
2008 – "Integrated and disintegrated, architectural cultures compared in a changing world", July 2008 Royal Theatre, Turin (Italy) 
2008 – "ABB2008", Beijing (China)
2009 – "La pietra e la sostenibilità", MADE EXPO 2009, Milan (Italy)
2009 – Conference URBAN SOLUTION 2009, Milan (Italy)
2009 – Conference "FUNHILL: Make Beijing Fun", Beijing (China)
2010 – "Eco Caos" Conference, 3–8 December 2010, San Benedetto del Tronto (Italy)
2011 – Conference at LUNID University, 2 May 2011, Rome (Italy)
2012 – Costi e benefici della Green Economy, May 2012 Palazzo Valentini, Rome (Italy)
2012 – "Reset", 28 September 2012, Recanati (Italy)
2012 – "Hypogeal Architecture" MADE EXPO 2012 - Workshop AAA+A, 20 October 2012, Fiera Milano Rho, Milan (Italy)
2013 – Perspective 2013, Enzo Eusebi, Venice (Italy)
2013 – Festival della Cultura Olivettiana, "Urbanistica e Territorio", 31 May – 1 June 2013, Ancona (Italy)
2013 – Palazzo dei Capitani, Povertà ed esclusione sociale. Quale ruolo per le regioni e le città? ANCI Marche, 12 June 2013, "Sala della Ragione", Ascoli Piceno (Italy)
2013 – International Forum of Technologic GreenForum internazionale del verde tecnologico, Ecotech green, PAYSAGE, Enzo Eusebi, Architettura Ipogea: natura e artificio, 13 September 2013, Padova Fiere, Padova (Italy)
2013 – Territori, città, imprese: smart o accoglienti?, Enzo Eusebi, The constancy of change, 29 September 2013, Offida (Italy)
2013 – MADE4CERAMICS, Ceramica Terra Cultura, Enzo Eusebi, Architettura Contemporanea e Ceramica di Tradizione, 5 October 2013, Milan (Italy)
2013 – MADE expo at IBL, Urbanizzazione in Cina, Enzo Eusebi, Esperienze di architettura e materiali italiani in cina, 5 October 2013, Milan (Italy)
2013 – ASIA – Pacific Hotel Design Association Annual Meeting, "Tourism in the Green Economy", Ritz-Carlton Chengdu, 24 November 2013, "Buzz Hotels", Enzo Eusebi Conference, Chengdu (China)
2013 – Chinese Ancient Village Conservation and Development, Yuan An, Enzo Eusebi Conference, 26 November 2013, (China)
2014 – Light+Building 2014, 30 March – 4 April 2014, Infinitree, Enzo Eusebi, Frankfurt (Germany)
2014 – Frozen 2014, Italy and China Contemporary Architecture Exhibition/Architectural Design Forum, 10 April 2014, Rome (Italy)
2014 – CHINA ITTC 2014, 15–18 April 2014, Infinitree for Smart City, Enzo Eusebi, Beijing (China)
2014 – Saint Petersburg Design Week, 21 May 2014, The Constancy of Change, Enzo Eusebi, Saint Petersburg, (Russia)
2014 – Dialogo Italo Cinese su Architettura e Design, 6 November 2014, MAXXI Rome (Italy)
2014 – XI CEDIA CONFERENCE, 11 November 2014, La Fattoria Globale del Futuro, Enzo Eusebi, Brussels (Belgium)
2014 – Triennale di Milano, URBAN PROMO 2014, Progettare Cibo nelle Fattorie Urbane del Futuro, 13 November 2014, Milan (Italy)
2015 – Tianjin Design Week 2015, "Algorythms and Modeling in Architecture, two case history", 24 May 2015, Tianjin (China)
2015 – Federal Gorgon Chinese Design 2015, "Algorythms and Modeling in Architecture, two case history, 30 May 2015", Hangzou (China))
2015 – Triennale di Milano, Agritecture & Landscape, 25 June 2015, Milan
2015 – Nanjing Creative Design Week 2015, 30 October 2015, Nanjing (China)
2015 – Nanjing Forum University, 31 October 2015, Nanjing (China)
2015 – Dialogue between Italy and China on Architecture and design, "Aesthetic Efficiency", 31 November 2015, Tsinghua University, Beijing (China)
2016 – "Il progetto sostenibile", 25 January 2016, Polytechnic University of Milan, Milan (Italy)
2016 – "Perspective 2016", 25 May 2016, Hotel Excelsior, Venice (Italy)

Exhibitions
1999 – "Mare di corda",  San Benedetto del Tronto (Italy)
2001 – "Giorno della memoria. Il ghetto di Terezin", San Benedetto del Tronto (Italy)
2002 – "Anne Frank, quello che non si è mai visto", San Benedetto del Tronto (Italy)
2003 – "Enzo Eusebi Urban Incoherence", San Benedetto del Tronto (Italy)
2003 – "La giornata della memoria. Non avevamo ancora incominciato a vivere", San Benedetto del Tronto (Italy)
2004 – Exhibition at the Venice Biennale, Venice (Italy)
2006 – "Italy builds Canton. Vent'anni di architettura italiana", Canton (China))
2006 – "Not For Food" at Salone Internazionale del Mobile, Milan (Italy)
2006 – "Italian Design on Tour", Shanghai (China)
2006 – "Not For Food", Moscow (Russia)
2006 – "Not For Food", New York City
2006 – "Not For Food", Las Vegas
2007 – "Design Made in Pesaro", Pesaro (Italy)
2007 – "Italian Design on Tour", Berlin (Germany)
2007 – "Not For Food", Mumbai (India)
2007 – "Not For Food", Athens (Greece)
2007 – "NOTHING STUDIO in produzione e mercati: rapporti cooperativi" at Institute of Architectural Research, Hanoi (Vietnam)
2010 – "Brevetti e creatività italiani", Shanghai (China)
2011 – "MORE LIGHT? LESS LIGHT?" at Triennale di Milano, Milan (Italy)
2012 – 13th Venice Biennale of Architecture "Common Ground", Venice (Italy)
2012 – "Urban Regeneration: Radial City, Viral City" at Beijing Design Week, Beijing (China)
2013 – "Architetture del Made in Italy at Emirates Palace, Abu Dhabi (United Arab Emirates)
2013 – "Architetture del Made in Italy at Moscow Manege, Moscow (Russia)
2014 – Light+building, Frankfurt (Germany)
2014 – "Infinitree for Smart City" at China ITTC, Beijing (China)
2015 –  "Algorithms and Modeling in Architecture" at Tianjin Design Week, Tianjin (China)

Awards
2004 – Polo Museale di Fermo, Runner-up Prize
2004 – Teofilo Patini Prize
2005 – Dan Lian's Award for the Museum of Malacology
2006 – Elle Decor International Design Awards
2007 – Kunlun Prize 2007 for Kunlun Towers
2008 – Marche IN/ARCH Prize 2008
2009 – Barbara Cappochin International Architecture Prize
2015 – Towards a Sustainable Expo Prize for WAA and CONAF pavilion

Bibliography

Monographs
 
 

Secondary source
 Eusebi, E.: Ancient Buildings Restoration Handbooks and New Technologies. (1993)
 10th International Brick/Block Masonry Conference: "Slow Diffusion" and "Under Pressure". (1994)
 La ricerca del recupero edilizio: La determinazione del contenuto d'acqua all'interno delle murature. (1994)
 Fioritto, A.: La normativa sui lavori pubblici: responsabilità, qualità, sicurezza. (1996)
 Abitare, n°365: Forme colorate per gli anziani. (Milan, Editrice Abitare Segesta, 1997)
 Di Salvatore, F.: Premio Tercas Architettura. Progetto per l'area ex fiera-mattatoio e lungo fiume vibrata. (1998)
 Censi, M.: A3..., n°000: Dinamismo tettonico e forme contaminate. (1999)
 Croci, M.N.: MareDiCorda. (1999)
 Deli, R.: La gestione delle informazioni in odontoiatria e ortodonzia: Il percorso delle informazioni. (1999)
 Mauri, M.; Babina, F.: Ottagono, n°139: Giovani under 35. (2000)
 Andreini, L.; Flora, N.; Gilardiello, P.; Postiglione, G.: Caffè e Ristoranti: For Love or Money. (Milan, Federico Motta Editore, 2000) 
 Boschi, Antonello: Showroom. (Milan, Federico Motta Editore, 2001) 
 Scevola, A.: New Bars, Cafes and Pubs in Italy: For Love or Money. (Milan, Edizioni l'archivolto, 2001) 
 Fabbrizzi, F.: Office Design: Mancinelli Associati. (Kempen, Germany, 2002) 
 Fabbrizzi, F.: Uffici: Mancinelli Associati. (Milan, Federico Motta Editore, 2002)
 L'Arca, n°175: Comunicazione globale urbana in Florence. (Milan, L'Arca, 2002) 
 New Shops 7: Made in Italy. (Milan, Edizioni l'archivolto, 2002)  
 De Santi, F.: L'Ospedale psichiatrico di Teramo nelle fotografie di Fabrizio Sclocchini: icone di fantasmi ed ossessioni. (2002)
 De Santi, F.: L'Architettura cronache e storia, n°573: Vincenzo Eusebi o l'architettura come soglia? (Rome, 2003)
 Pellegrini, P.C.: Mare di corda. Viaggio nel mondo dei mestieri di corda e di mare. Allestimenti museali (Milan, Federico Motta Editore, 2003)
 Pellegrini, P.C.: Casa Carminati - Di Crosta. Ristrutturazioni (Milan, Federico Motta Editore, 2003)
 D'Architettura: Ampliamento I.P.S.S.A.R. (Milan, Federico Motta Editore, 2003)
 Flora, Nicola: Maisons de créateurs 2. (France, Actes Sud, 2003) 
 Flora, Nicola: Case d'autore 2. "Casa dell'artista". (Milan, Federico Motta Editore, 2003) 
 L'Architettura Cronache e Storia, n°573: Vincenzo Eusebi o l'architettura come soglia. (Rome, July 2003)
 Pieroni, Francesca: Designplaza. (April 2004)
 Franchin, A.: Bagni. (Milano, Federico Motta Editore, 2004) 
 De Santi, F.: Artivisive Teofilo Patini: Enzo Eusebi. (Teramo, Edigrafital, 2004)
 Micheli, S.: Showroom. (Milan, Federico Motta Editore, 2004) 
 HY, "Towers Kunlun" (2005)
 Gallo, P.: Renovated Houses 2: Dinamismo Verticale. (Milan, Edizioni l'archivolto, 2005)
 L'Arca, n°200: I.P.S.S.A.R. High School. (2005)
 Vogliazzo, M.: Italy Builds: "Colore". (2005)
 Premio Biennale Internazionale di Architettura "Barbara Cappochin": "Ampliamento I.P.S.S.A.R.". (2005)
 Caponi, D.: Domus Aurea, n°3: "Il delicato equilibrio tra l'organico e il razionale". (2005)
 L'Arca, n°200: "A School Extension". (2005)
 Italy Build Canton: Vent'anni di architettura. (Guangzhou, 2006)
 Casabella, n°746: Not For Food. (Milan, Arnoldo Mondadori Editore, 2006)
 Interni, n°9: Sinuosità e materiali futuribili per un nuovo concetto di Hi-Tech. (Milan, Arnoldo Mondadori Editore, 2006)
 Patanè, C.: OTTAGONO – DESIGN, ARCHITETTURA, IDEE, n°190: Scenografia e fornelli. (Milan, Ricerche Design Editrice, 2006)
 Higginson, J.: LP LUXURY PROPERTIES: Beijing 360 degree PENTHOUSE. (Hong Kong, Poly Graphic Company Limited, 2006)
 Mudergi: Not For Food. (Istanbul, 2006)
 Llao, A.: K+ BB DESIGN + INNOVATION + LIFESTYLE, vol.53, n°5: Living Large. (2006)
 Young-Hye, Lee: Not For Food. (Seoul, Design, 2006)
 Xu, Wang: Not For Food, Elle Decoration International Design Awards 2006. (Beijing, Elle Decoration China, 2006)
 Feng, Pan: Kunlun Towers. (Beijing, Luxurious Living, 2006)
 Oddo, F.: Il Sole 24 Ore – Progetti e Concorsi – Edilizia e Territorio: Marche. Ricerca confinata ai banchi di scuola. (Milan, Il Sole 24 Ore – Progetti e Concorsi – Edilizia e Territorio, 2006)
 Petrolo, G.: Famiglia Cristiana: Una svolta in cucina. (Alba Piedmont, Famiglia Cristiana, 2006)
 Pizzi, M.; Carimati, P.: Abitare, n°461: Cucine Nuovissime. (Milan, Abitare, 2006)
 Pavesi, M.: Grazia Casa Estate, n°25: "Not for food". (2006)
 Design, n°336: "Not for food". (2006)
 Llao, A.: K+BB DESIGN + INNOVATION + LIFESTYLE: "Not for food". (2006)
 Balutto, V.: GAP casa, n°198: "Not for food". (2006)
 Vista, M.: L'Arca, n°216: "New Kitchens". (2006)
 Real Estate New House: "Living Art Unique". (2007)
 Kingland. (2007)
 Progetti, n°20: "Kunlun Towers, Beijing, P. R. China". (2007)
 Sistemi informativi per l'architettura: "Not for food". (2007)
 Marche Design in Arcobaleno Italiano in Vietnam: "Nothing Studio in produzione e mercati: rapporti cooperativi". (2007)
 Xu, Wang: Beijing a 360 gradi. (Beijing, Elle Decoration China, 2007)
 Eusebi, Enzo: NOTHING STUDIO in produzione e mercati: rapporti cooperativi. (Hanoi, Institute of Architectural Research, 2007)
 D'Amico, Fortunato: Ala colpisce nel segno a Build Up. (Milan, Italia Oggi, 2007)
 Braun, Verlagshaus: 1000 x European Architecture: Extension to the government professional institute for hotel and catering services. (2007)
 Yang, Chun: China Real Estate Magazine: Enzo Eusebi. (Beijing, 2007)
 Pierotti, P.:  "Il disegno italiano si fa largo in Cina": Progetti di Edilizia e Territorio. (Milan, Il Sole 24 Ore, 24–29 December 2007)
 Papucci, A.; Picini, A.: "Chalet Touch" Premio Biennale e Internazionale di Architettura Barbara Cappochin. (Milan, Federico Motta Editore, 2007)
 D'Amico, F.: Ristrutturo Rinnovo Casa, n°4: "Un loft dinamico". (2007)
 Metropolis: "High-end Business Center - Kunlun Gallery". (2007)
 Guidi, G.: Mondo Lavoro, n°1: "Il talento architettonico tutto marchigiano". (2007)
 Viabizzuno report, n°16. (2007)
 Marson, E.: Ottagono Extra – Guida ai Saloni, "Enzo Eusebi. Cucina per Berloni". (Bologna, Editrice Compositori, 16–21 April 2008)
 Pisani, M.: L'Arca, n°235: "NOTHING STUDIO", Lee Weimin Architects office, Arthur Erickson Architect. (Milan, L'Arca Edizione, April 2008)
 Buzzi, P.; Ciani, P.: Il trionfo del design, (Milan, Corriere della Sera Magazine – RCS, 10 April 2008
 L'Arca, n° 238: "Magliana Redevelopment, Italy". (Milan, L'Arca Edizione, April 2008)
 Minoli A.; Savino C.: Caffè e Ristoranti D'Autore, "Chalet Touch, Eusebi/NOTHING STUDIO". Milan, 24 Ore Motta Cultura srl, May 2008)
 Minoli A.; Savino C.: Negozi e Showroom D'Autore, "Showroom Wind, Eusebi/NOTHING STUDIO". Milan, 24 Ore Motta Cultura srl, May 2008)
 Ambiente Cucina, n°184: "Enzo Eusebi designer di Quore per Berloni". (Milan, Il Sole 24 Ore business media srl, June–July 2008)
 Ambiente Cucina, Special Edition 2008: "Kitchen - in cucina". (2008)
 OF ARCH, n°102: "Accumulation". (2008)
 Design Vakblad Keuken, "Enzo Eusebi versus de snobs". (September 2008)
 Presenza Tecnica, n°233: "Una scuola e il suo ambiente". (2008)
 L'Arca, n°233: "Museo di Malacologia". (2008)
Flammini, P.P.: Riviera Oggi, n°716: "A Pechino osannato a San Benedetto dimenticato". (2008)
 Mondo Lavoro, n°5: "È essenziale alleggerire l'Iva sugli acquisti". (2008)
 Eusebi, E.: Mondo Lavoro, n°8: "(Eco) sostenibilità o (ego) sostenibilità?". (2009)
 Mondo Lavoro, n°11-12: "Enzo Eusebi e le Marche in Cina". (2009)
 CAAOH: "Not for food...". (2009)
 L'Arca, n°243: "ABB2008". (Milan, L'Arca Edizione, 2009)
 L'Arca, n°248: Un'idea per l'emergenza. (Milan, L'Arca Edizione, 2009)
 Scianca, G.: L'Arca: "Architectural Italian Language". (2009)
 D'Amico, F.: OF ARCH, n°108: Laboratorio di Architettura: una cultura ediizia sostenibile. (2009)
 D'Amico, Fortunato: OF ARCH, n°110: Enzo Eusebi. Not for.... (Milan, Electa, September – October 2009)
 Manuale Viabizzuno (Bologna, 2010)
 UT MMVII IL CORAGGIO: "Fiori del male". (2010)
 Mascetti, G.: Mondo Lavoro, n°2: "Innovazione, eco-compatibilità e qualità: armi vincenti del Gruppo Berloni". (2010)
 Progetti, n°25: "Not for food". (2010)
 Case da abitare: "Cucina retrò-tech". (2010)
 The Architect, n°53: "NOTHING... OR SOMETHING?". (2010)
 Disegno e Design: "Brevetti e creatività italiani". (Shanghai, 29 April – 31 August 2010) 
 ARREDAMENTO & DESIGN: Novità Cucine, DUEMILA60 Berloni. (La Repubblica Grandi Guide, May 2010)
 Vella Lenicker, Simone: The Architect, n°53: "Nothing...or something?", Enzo Eusebi/NOTHING STUDIO. (The Architect, July 2010).
 Canorro, M.: Insideart, n°67: "Sotto una volta di tessuto". (2010)
 Why Marche, n°2: "L'Eusebio pensiero". (2011)
 Posabella, A.: L'Urlo, n°14: "Enzo Eusebi ingegnere: un architetto in dieci mosse". (2011)
 Piccioli, P.: Design Diffusion News: "Enzo Eusebi e l'Unicità d'Italia". (2011)
 Colli, C.: Progetti, n°27: "La Chiesa della Resurrezione a L'Aquila". (2011)
 US, n°1: "Chiesa della Resurrezione". (2011)
 Premio Libero Bizzarri: "Cultura nonostante tutto". (2011)
 Bellino, E.: italiArchitettura vol.5: "Domestica". (2011)
 Catalogo Mostra Unicità d'Italia: Made in Italy e Identità Nazionale. (May 2011)
 Incontroluce iGuzzini, n°23: "Showroom Domestica". (2011)
 L'architetto italiano, n°47: "Enzo Eusebi: eclettismo e rigore". (2012)
 Incontroluce iGuzzini, n°26: "Light & Building 2012". (2013)
 Firmani, M.A.: Parallelo 42, n°12: "Tra spazio pubblico e privato incontro con Loris Cecchini e Enzo Eusebi" (2013)
 Catalogo Biennale Architettura, Le quattro stagioni / Architetture del Made in Italy da Adriano Olivetti alla Green Economy. (Milan, Electa, 2013) 
 Catalogo iGuzzini 2013-14: "Albero" (2013)
 Mariangela, U.: Dalla casa di ricovero della gente di mare all'istituto alberghiero. (2014)
 Paysage Topscape, n° 17: "Opificio Sal.Pi. Uno". (Paysage Editore, 2014) 
 Paysage Topscape, n° 20: "Fattoria Globale 2.0. Al tempo del digitale, Padiglione WAA EXPO2015". (Paysage Editore, 2015) ISSN 2279-7610
 Catalogo iGuzzini 2015: "Albero" (2015)
 Catalogo Ufficiale Expo 2015 - Nutrire il pianeta, energia per la vita. (Milan, Electa 24 Ore Cultura, 2015) 
 Eusebi, E.: V. Dehò, Eusebi Terenzio - Gioco Quotidiano: "Oggi vedremo cose inutili" (2015)
 Topics & Tools iGuzzini, Second Half: "Quid" (2015)
 Paysage Topscape, n°20. (Milan 2015)
 22a Rassegna del Documentario Premio Libero Bizzarri (2015)
 Il Foglio del Mobile, n°1: "Kunlun Towers" (2015)
 , n°85: Il pensioner in opera. (October 2015) 
 , n°86: Global Farm of the Future Expo 2015. (November 2015) 
 Abitare, n°551: Finiture di gran gusto. (January 2016) 
 L'Arca International, n°128: Fattoria Globale 2.0: Padiglione WAA/CONAF. (January–February 2016) ISSN 1027-460X
 Dezeen: Enzo Eusebi builds sunken prosciutto factory in the Italian countryside. (26 January 2016'')

External links

 ENZO EUSEBI + PARTNERS
 NOTHING STUDIO

1960 births
20th-century Italian architects
21st-century Italian architects
Living people
People from San Benedetto del Tronto